The 1972 NCAA College Division football season was the 17th and final season of college football in the United States organized by the National Collegiate Athletic Association at the NCAA College Division level.

Conference realignment

Membership changes

Conference standings

Rankings

College Division teams (also referred to as "small college") were ranked in polls by the AP (a panel of writers) and by UPI (coaches). The national champion(s) for each season were determined by the final poll rankings, published at or near the end of the regular season, before any bowl games were played.

College Division final polls
Both the UPI and AP panels ranked Delaware (10–0) first, followed by Louisiana Tech (11–0), and Cal Poly (8–0–1). Louisiana Tech later defeated  in the Grantland Rice Bowl, while Cal Poly lost to North Dakota in the Camellia Bowl. Delaware declined an invitation to face UMass (7–2) in the Boardwalk Bowl, and did not play in the postseason.

United Press International (coaches) final poll
Published on November 22

Associated Press (writers) final poll
Published on November 23

Tennessee State actually 9–1 when the poll was taken.

Bowl games
The postseason consisted of four bowl games as regional finals, all played on December 10.

Black college national championship
Grambling defeated  in the inaugural Pelican Bowl to capture the black college football national championship.

See also
 1972 NCAA University Division football season
 1972 NAIA Division I football season
 1972 NAIA Division II football season

References